The 2018 FIA Formula 2 Championship was the fifty-second season of the second-tier of Formula One feeder championship and also second season under the moniker of FIA Formula 2 Championship, a motor racing championship for Formula 2 cars that is sanctioned by the Fédération Internationale de l'Automobile (FIA). It is an open-wheel racing category that serves as the second tier of formula racing in the FIA Global Pathway. The category run in support of the 2018 FIA Formula One World Championship, with each of the twelve rounds running in conjunction with a Grand Prix. It was the first FIA Formula 2 season to feature a new chassis and engine package.

Charles Leclerc was the reigning drivers' champion, having won the title at the penultimate round of the 2017 championship in Jerez de la Frontera. Leclerc subsequently secured a Formula 1 drive with the Alfa Romeo Sauber team in 2018 Russian Time were the reigning teams' champions, having secured their first Formula 2 title at the final round of the 2017 championship in Abu Dhabi. George Russell won the drivers' championship, finishing 68 points ahead of Lando Norris. In the teams' championship, Carlin prevailed over ART Grand Prix by 31 points.

Changes for 2018

Technical changes

The season saw the introduction of a brand new chassis and engine package, the biggest change in the sport's history. The GP2/11 chassis, which had been used by Formula 2 and its predecessor GP2 since 2011, was replaced by the Dallara F2 2018. It is powered by a fuel-efficient  V6 single turbocharged direct-injected engine developed by Mecachrome called V634T. The aging naturally-aspirated V8 engine and Dallara GP2/11 chassis which were used since 2005 and 2011 respectively were permanently retired. Despite the generational change of chassis and engines, Elf would continue as a preferred official fuel partner and supplier of FIA Formula 2 Championship and also Pirelli FIA Formula 2 tyre sizes would remained same as pre-2017 Formula One tyres. In addition, the Pirelli FIA Formula 2 hard tyre colour would repainted from orange to ice blue in a reference of 2018 Formula One dry slick tyre compounds.

Sporting regulations
Teams were required to use the "halo" cockpit protection device, a wishbone-shaped frame mounted above and around the driver's head and anchored to the monocoque forward of the cockpit. The halo was designed to improve safety standards by deflecting debris away from a driver's head and was originally developed for use in Formula One before its application was expanded to other open-wheel championships and it was incorporated into the final design of the Dallara F2 2018 chassis.

Following widespread criticism of the Dallara F2 2018 for its difficult start procedure and reliability issues, the championship temporarily introduced rolling starts until a solution to the car's problems could be found.

Other changes
The championship discontinued the use of promotional models or "grid girls". The decision was made by Formula One management in the face of changing social attitudes and the decision by other sports to phase out the use of models, and the decision applied to all categories appearing on the Grand Prix support bill, including Formula 2.

Entries 
The following teams and drivers were under contract to compete in the 2018 FIA Formula 2 Championship. As the championship was a spec series, all competitors raced with identical Dallara F2 2018 chassis with a V6 turbo engine developed by Mecachrome. Teams competed with tyres supplied by Pirelli.

Team changes
Twenty entries spread across ten teams were entered into the championship. Carlin returned to Formula 2 in 2018 after a one-year absence, while former World Series Formula V8 3.5 team Charouz Racing System joined the championship. Charouz left the Formula 3.5 V8 championship when the championship was discontinued and the team subsequently submitted an entry to join the Formula 2 grid which marked the return of a Czech single-seater junior team to the second tier of Formula One's feeder championships since the 2003 International Formula 3000 season. Racing Engineering were included on the initial entry list but later withdrew from the championship to focus on their European Le Mans Series entry. Fortec Motorsports were due to make their Formula 2 début, replacing the departing Rapax team, but later withdrew their entry due to a lack of sponsorship. Fortec were later granted permission to defer their entry by a year and were scheduled to make their début in 2019, but aborted the plans.

Driver changes
Defending teams' champions Russian Time signed FIA Formula 3 European Championship driver Tadasuke Makino to partner Artem Markelov. With reigning drivers' champion Charles Leclerc leaving the series to join Formula 1 team Sauber. Prema Racing enlisted Sean Gelael, who left Arden International to join the team. Gelael was partnered by Nyck de Vries, who drove for Rapax and Racing Engineering throughout the 2017 championship. Gustav Malja, who raced for Racing Engineering in 2017, moved to the Porsche Supercup.

Alexander Albon left ART Grand Prix to join DAMS where he replaced Oliver Rowland; Rowland left the series and moved to the FIA World Endurance Championship. Albon was paired with Nicholas Latifi, who remained with the team for a third year. ART Grand Prix promoted reigning GP3 Series champion George Russell to the category, partnering him with Jack Aitken, who also drove for the team in GP3. Nobuharu Matsushita, who drove for the team in 2017, left the series and returned to Japan to race in the Super Formula Championship.

Ralph Boschung left Campos Racing to join MP Motorsport. He was accompanied by Roberto Merhi, who previously competed in selected rounds of the championship with Campos and Rapax in 2017. Jordan King, who raced for MP, moved to the United States to compete in the IndyCar Series. With Gelael's switch to Prema and Norman Nato's departure to the European Le Mans Series, Arden International promoted two rookie drivers. Former GP3 Series driver Nirei Fukuzumi filled one seat, while Maximilian Günther—who finished second in the 2016 FIA Formula 3 European Championship and third in 2017—took the other.

Luca Ghiotto left Russian Time after a single season to join Campos Racing. He was partnered by series debutant Roy Nissany, who left the World Series Formula V8 3.5 to join the championship. Álex Palou left the team to compete in the FIA Formula 3 European Championship. Trident recruited two of Formula One team Haas' development drivers. Santino Ferrucci, who had contested five rounds of the 2017 championship with the team, was signed for the season. He is partnered by Arjun Maini, who was promoted from the GP3 Series. Nabil Jeffri, who raced for Trident in 2017, left the team to join the FIA World Endurance Championship.

Sérgio Sette Câmara left MP Motorsport to join newcomers Carlin. He was partnered by Lando Norris, who won the 2017 FIA Formula 3 European Championship title with Carlin before making a guest appearance in the Formula 2 Championship with Campos Racing. Louis Delétraz and Antonio Fuoco joined Charouz Racing System. Delétraz left Rapax after the team withdrew from the championship, while Fuoco moved from Prema Racing as part of an agreement with Ferrari's driver development programme.

Mid-season changes
Santino Ferrucci was banned for two rounds as punishment for multiple violations of the sporting and technical regulations—including deliberately crashing into Arjun Maini—during the Silverstone round. He was later dismissed by Trident, with the team citing sponsorship issues rather than his suspension as the reason for Ferrucci's firing. Ferrucci was replaced by Trident's GP3 Series driver Alessio Lorandi for the Hungaroring round.

Roberto Merhi left MP Motorsport before the Spa-Francorchamps round. He was replaced by Dorian Boccolacci, who raced for the team in the GP3 Series. For the remainder of the season he joined Campos Vexatec Racing, replacing Roy Nissany. MP Motorsport promoted Niko Kari from their GP3 Series team, where he replaced Ralph Boschung for the remainder of the season. Dan Ticktum replaced Maximilian Günther at BWT Arden for the season finale at Abu Dhabi.

Calendar
The following twelve rounds took place as part of the 2018 championship.

Calendar changes
The calendar was expanded to twelve rounds in 2018. The championship started at the Circuit Paul Ricard, where it was featured as part of the French Grand Prix support programme. The championship visited the Sochi Autodrom for the first time, where it ran in support of the Russian Grand Prix. The stand-alone event that was held at the Circuito de Jerez in 2017 was discontinued.

Results

Season summary

Championship standings

Scoring system
Points were awarded to the top 10 classified finishers in the Feature race, and to the top 8 classified finishers in the Sprint race. The pole-sitter in the feature race also received four points, and two points were given to the driver who set the fastest lap inside the top ten in both the feature and sprint races. No extra points are awarded to the pole-sitter in the sprint race as the grid for the sprint race is based on the results of the feature race with the top eight drivers having their positions reversed.

Feature race points

Sprint race points

Drivers' championship

Notes:
 – Drivers did not finish the race, but were classified as they completed more than 90% of the race distance.

Teams' championship

Notes:
 – Drivers did not finish the race, but were classified as they completed more than 90% of the race distance.

Notes

References

External links
 FIA Formula 2 Championship official website

 
FIA Formula 2 Championship
FIA Formula 2 Championship seasons
Formula 2